Jackie Sawiris is a Jordanian/Egyptian actress, writer and film-maker who is best known for playing the Arabian genie Majida in Knightmare from 1993 to 1994. Other notable performances include playing Roz in Eyes Wide Shut (1999).

Acting career
Her character in Knightmare was Sawiris's breakthrough role, she appeared in the show for 2 years until the series ended in 1994, replacing actor David Learner who played the wood elf Pickle. Her role in the series was to provide some comic relief, Majida would often summon the Dungeoneers in herself and in Episode 1 of Season 7 she changes the original horned Helmet of Justice for a new one (complete with a visor), much to the annoyance of Treguard (Hugo Myatt).

Selected other film and TV Credits include 45 Minutes to Rammalah (2013), Incendies (2010), 10 Days to War (2008), The Bill (1998), The Big Swap (1998), Emmerdale (4 episodes in 1998), the video game Krazy Ivan (1995) and Death Machine (1994).

Producer/director
Since 1988 Sawiris has worked behind the camera as a director and producer on many Film & TV Productions. She was assistant director (1st AD/2nd Unit) on The Mummy Returns (2001). She was also Production Secretary on 12 episodes of The Wire in 2003.

She is currently working on a selection of projects and films, some written, directed and starring herself.

References

External links
 Official Site

Egyptian film actresses
Living people
Year of birth missing (living people)
Egyptian television actresses
Egyptian film directors
Egyptian women film directors
Place of birth missing (living people)
Egyptian film producers